The Alamyshyk Too (or Alamyshyk Range) is a mountain range in the internal Tien-Shan  to the west of Naryn Too between Naryn Valley and At-Bashy Valley. The range is located in At-Bashi District of Naryn Region. The mountains are composed of limestone of Devonian and Carboniferous. There are some caves in the mountains. The northern slopes are covered by spruce and bushes, southern - by semi-desert dry steppe plants, and eastern slopes and higher altitudes covered by sub-Alpian feather grass.

References

Mountain ranges of Kyrgyzstan